Kishan Singh Chongtham (born 10 June 1998) is an Indian professional footballer who plays as a midfielder for I-League club TRAU.

Club career

TRAU
On  1 January 2018, Kishan joined then I-League 2nd Division club TRAU.

On 12 March 2022, Kishan scored his first goal for the club against Churchill Brothers, in a 2–0 win.

Career statistics

Club

References

Indian footballers
Living people
1998 births
NEROCA FC players
TRAU FC players